In ancient Greece the chief magistrate in various Greek city states was called eponymous archon (ἐπώνυμος ἄρχων, epōnymos archōn). "Archon" (ἄρχων, pl. ἄρχοντες, archontes) means "ruler" or "lord", frequently used as the title of a specific public office, while "eponymous" means that he gave his name to the year in which he held office, much like the Roman dating by consular years.

In Classical Athens, a system of nine concurrent archons evolved, led by three respective remits over the civic, military, and religious affairs of the state: the three office holders were known as the eponymous archon, the polemarch (πολέμαρχος, "war ruler"), and the archon basileus (ἄρχων βασιλεύς, "king ruler"). The six others were the thesmothetai, judicial officers.  Originally these offices were filled from the wealthier classes by elections every ten years. During this period the eponymous archon was the chief magistrate, the polemarch was the head of the armed forces, and the archon basileus was responsible for some civic religious arrangements, and for the supervision of some major trials in the law courts. After 683 BC the offices were held for only a single year, and the year was named after the eponymous archon.

Background

The archon was the chief magistrate in many Greek cities, but in Athens there was a council of archons which exerted a form of executive government. From the late 8th century BC there were three archons: the archon eponymos, the polemarchos (originally with a military role, which was transferred to the ten strategoi in 501 BC), and the archon basileus (the ceremonial vestige of the Athenian monarchy). These positions were filled from the aristocracy (the Eupatridae) by elections every ten years. During this period Archon Eponymous was the chief magistrate, the Polemarch was the head of the armed forces, and the Archon Basileus was responsible for the civic religious arrangements.

After 683 BC the offices were held for only a single year, and the year was named after the archon eponymous. The year ran from July to June. The archon eponymous was the chief archon, and presided over meetings of the Boule and Ecclesia, the ancient Athenian assemblies. The archon eponymous remained the titular head of state even under the democracy, though with much reduced political importance. Under the reforms of Solon, himself archon eponymous in 594 BC, there was a brief period when the number of archons rose to ten. After 457 BC ex-archons were automatically enrolled as life members of the Areopagus, though that assembly was no longer extremely important politically.

One of the archons oversaw the procedure for ostracism after 487 BC. An archon's court was in charge of the epikleroi. Other duties of the archons included supervising the Panathenaea and Dionysia festivals.

List of archons of Athens
In the following list of Archons, years where the name of the archon is unknown are identified as such. Years listed as "anarchy" mean that there was literally "no archon". There are various conflicting reconstructions of lists; sources for this list are given at the end. Note that the term of an archon covered two of our years, beginning in the spring or summer and continuing into the next spring or summer. The polemarch or strategoi, basileus, and thesmothetai (the six assistants to the archons) are also listed, where known.

Archaic period

Life archons

The later Athenian tradition varies on the exact position of this line; they held archonship for life, sometimes referred to as "Perpetual Archon", and exercised the sacral powers of kingship, as did the archon basileus later. The historicity of any of this ancient list may be reasonably doubted. Aristotle indicates that Medon and Acastus may have ruled as king rather than Archon.

Decennial archons
In 753 BC the perpetual archonship by the Eupatridae was limited to 10 years (the "decennial archons"):

Annual archons

After 683 BC the archonship was limited to one year. Archons resided in the Prytaneum.

Reorganized

Classical period

Hellenistic period

Roman period

See also 
 :Category:Eponymous archons
 Timeline of ancient Greece
 Regnal name
 Archon basileus
 Hierotheos the Thesmothete, reported first head of the Christians of Athens.
 Polemarch (replaced in 501 BC by ten strategoi)
 Roman consul

References

Further reading
 Adkins, Lesley and Roy A. Handbook to Life in Ancient Greece New York: Oxford University Press 1997 
 Aristotle's Athenian Constitution
 
 Dinsmoor, William Bell The Archons of Athens in the Hellenistic Age. Cambridge, 1931 (1966 reprint)
 Dinsmoor, William Bell The Athenian Archon List in the Light of Recent Discoveries. Columbia University Press, 1939 (1974 reprint)
 Fox, Robin Lane The Classical World: An Epic History from Homer to Hadrian New York: Basic Books 2006 
 Hamel, Debra Athenian Generals: Military Authority in the Classical Period. Koninklijke Brill NV, 1998.
 Graindor, Paul Chronologie des archontes athéniens sous l'Empire, Brussels, 1922 (Mémoires de l'Académie de Belgique, 4°, 1921),
 Lacey, W. K. The Family in Classical Greece Ithaca, NY: Cornell University Press 1968
 Owens, Ron Justice and the Political Reforms of Solon, Eponymous Archon at Athens, 594–593 BC. Australian National University, 2000.
 Rostovtzeff, Michael. Greece. 2nd.ed. Oxford: Oxford University Press, 1963.

Ancient Athenian titles
Ancient timelines
Ancient Greece-related lists
 

hu:Arkhón